In the United States, Advanced Placement (AP) Physics collectively refers to the College Board Advanced Placement Program courses and exams covering various areas of physics. These are intended to be equivalent to university courses that use best practices of physics teaching pedagogy.

Each AP Physics course has an optional exam for which high-performing students may receive some credit towards their college coursework, depending on which college or university they attend.

AP Physics A (conceptual)(never materialized)

Designed concurrently with AP Physics B and AP Physics C, AP Physics A was supposed to be a conceptual-only version of AP Physics B (see below). This course would have employed little to no mathematics. AP Physics A never proceeded past the development stage, as colleges would not offer credit for physics without mathematics.

AP Physics B (algebra based)(discontinued)
In 1969, the single AP Physics Exam was replaced by two separate exams, AP Physics B and AP Physics C. AP Physics B was supposed to be equivalent to an introductory algebra-based college course in physics, with a laboratory component. The course was non-calculus-based, utilizing algebra and basic trigonometry to solve various physics problems. AP Physics B was divided into five different sections: Newtonian mechanics, fluid mechanics and thermal physics, electricity and magnetism, waves and optics, and atomic and nuclear physics.

AP Physics B was replaced in 2014 by AP Physics 1 and 2.

AP Physics 1 and 2
AP Physics 1 and AP Physics 2 were introduced for the 2015 exam administration. The courses were designed to emphasize critical thinking and reasoning as well as learning through inquiry. They remain as algebra-based courses that do not require students to have taken calculus.

AP Physics 1 covers the same Newtonian mechanics as AP Physics B plus rotational mechanics. The course used to cover introductory electricity (Coulomb's Law and simple DC circuits), as well as mechanical waves and sound. These units were removed during the 2020 - 2021 school year.

AP Physics 2 covers the remaining subjects from AP Physics B: thermodynamics, fluid mechanics, optics, electricity and magnetism, and modern physics.

AP Physics C (calc based)
From 1969 to 1972, the AP Physics C course covered all of physics, including fluids, optics, and modern physics as well as mechanics and electricity and magnetism. The College Board split AP Physics C into two different 90 minute tests in 1973, each equivalent to a semester-length calculus-based college course for majors in physical science or engineering: Until 2006, both exams were available for a single fee; in 2006, this was changed to the exams having separate fees.  

 AP Physics C: Mechanics studies Newtonian mechanics, with units on kinematics; Newton's laws of motion; work, energy, and power; systems of particles and linear momentum; circular motion and rotation; and oscillations and gravitation.
 AP Physics C: Electricity and Magnetism studies electricity and magnetism, covering electrostatics; conductors, capacitors, and dielectrics; electric circuits; magnetic fields; and electromagnetism.

The two AP Physics C courses can be combined to make a unified Physics C course that prepares for both exams.

See also 
Glossary of physics

References

Advanced Placement
Physics education